Mount Aspiring College is a state coeducational secondary school in Wānaka, New Zealand. It was founded in 1986 after the division of Wanaka Area School into separate primary and secondary schools. The college, though normally a day school, operates a hostel beside the school grounds for 30 Year 13 students.

Enrolment
Mount Aspiring College is naturally zoned by the school's isolation (the nearest alternative secondary school is Cromwell College, 55 kilometres away in Cromwell), therefore does not need to operate an enrolment scheme. The school's effective service area extends north to Makarora, east to Tarras and Queensberry, south to Cardrona, and west to the Southern Alps.

At the August 2015 Education Review Office (ERO) review of the school, the school had 789 students enrolled, including 39 international students. The school roll's gender composition was 51% male and 49% female. The ethnic composition was 88% European (Pākehā), 7% Māori, 3% Asian, and 2% Other.

At the September 2019 Education Review Office (ERO) review of the school, the school had 1078 students enrolled, including 32 international students. The ERO report found

School houses 

Mount Aspiring has four houses: Barker, Iron, Pisa and Roy. Each house represents a different mountain in the Wānaka area. The houses are each assigned a colour: Barker is green, Iron is red, Pisa is yellow and Roy is blue. The houses compete during the year to win the house shield. Examples of activities are Cross Country running, Skiing, Swimming, Singing competition, 40 Hour Famine, Athletics and Tug of War. Before 2002, when the roll grew too large, the school had three houses, Wilkin, Clutha and Hunter, named after local rivers. Prior to that, there were only two houses, East and West.

Principals
 1989–1998: Michael (Mike) Allison
 1998–2008: Maurice (Maurie) Jackways
 2008–2020: Wayne Bosley
 2020–2021: Dean Sheppard (acting)
 2021–present : Nicola Jacobsen

Hostel Program
The College operates a year 13 boarding program and intakes 30 students each year, the program is notable for its intensive outdoor pursuits program, which runs alongside daily time-tabled classes.

The Mount Aspiring College Village consists of five custom-built flats, constructed in 1996. Each flat is named after notable landmarks in the local area; Arawhata- named afterArawhata River, Avalanche- named after Avalanche Peak (New Zealand), Cascade- named after Cascade Saddle (Located in Mount Aspiring National Park), Liverpool- named after Liverpool Hut and Rob Roy- named after Rob Roy Glacier

Notable alumni

 Ellesse Andrews (born 1999), Olympic track cyclist
 Zoi Sadowski-Synnott (born 2001), Olympic snowboarder

See also
List of schools in New Zealand

References

External links
School website
Education Review Office (ERO) reports for Mount Aspiring College
ERO report

Boarding schools in New Zealand
Educational institutions established in 1986
Secondary schools in Otago
Wānaka
1986 establishments in New Zealand